Cartirana is a municipality located in Aragon, Huesca, Spain. It is approximately 15 km northwest of Jaca.

Location 
Cartirana is located 2 kilometers from Sabiñago (northwestern direction) in a plateau, similar to others in this area, at an  altitude of 857 meters.

History 
This place was first mentioned in 1100 in the will of a man named April that said he owned several houses and a palace in the place. In the 12th century, other properties seemed to be in possession of Fanlo and Montearagón monasteries.

Late XV siegle, there were 8 houses in the place. This amount was reduced to 5 and 30 inhabitants in mid-19th century. In 1981, 51 persons were registered in populational roll.

At the beginning, Cartirana was a suburb of next city of Jaca, until it created its own municipality in 1834. In 1845, Aurín and Borres linked their management to Cartirana, and from 1930 and 1949, Larres did similar. Nowadays, all these places are integrated in Sabiñanigo municipality.

Demography

Popular architecture 
Its streets are an irregular layout and the town is renewed, while few examples that still show the old folk architecture."Casa Ubieto", "Casa Pablo" and "Casa Latas" stand out in the urban. On the other hand, "casa Escolano" shows the best features of vernacular architecture as the "serrablesa" chimney, framed windows and the typical oven.

Other items to note are the parish church of San Martín, the Hermitage in St. Lucia and the entire laundry and supplies.

San Martín parish church 
The old church belonged to archpriesthood of Ahornes. The parish is mentioned among the archdeaconry of Camara and was dedicated to San Martín, with its image as the only existing  in altar in 1499. At that time were kept in the church chalices of silver and nine liturgical codices.
Today, church, modern-looking inside, stands on the outside of the tower, slim, reminiscent in appearance to those of  Gállego. Back inside, access to the choir and the current northern foot of the wall, we find ourselves with a gateway arch, with projecting imposts bevel, forming a horseshoe arch false style of   Gállego mozarabe.

Santa Lucía chapel 
A chapel was built in 1701 in honour of Santa Lucía. It was renewed in 1981, when it was in ruins.

Water springs and supply 
Town is water supplied from tanks in next Santa Lucia hill (they also supply to Sabiñanigo, municipality head). Although, from old age, town was supplied by water springs located behind the church, in  a hollow of surrounding terrain. Washing place and water springs were recently renewed.

Water from spring is stored in a small reservoir for its use in close greengardens.

A new water spring was discovered in the early 1990s and was acondicionated in a new fountain called "La fontañona", which is situated just down the dam.

Festivities 
Main festivities are in honor of San Martín (11 November) and minor ones are in honor of Santa Lucia (13 December).

Notes and references

External links 
  Toros en Cartirana

Bibliography 
 Aragón pueblo a pueblo, 4; ZAPATER, ALFONSO. Mainer Til Editores, S.L. .

Municipalities in the Province of Huesca
Sabiñánigo